Fountaindale is a semi-rural suburb of the Central Coast region of New South Wales, Australia. It is part of the  local government area.

Fountaindale is also the location of a Rudolf Steiner School, which moved from North Gosford. This school has benefited the community with a new roundabout as well as other road repairs and upgrades.

References

Suburbs of the Central Coast (New South Wales)